Aleksandr Aleksandrovich Bogomolov Jr. (born April 23, 1983), nicknamed Bogie, is a Russian-American retired professional tennis player.

Tennis career

Bogomolov's father, Alex Sr., was a former Soviet national tennis coach who worked with Larisa Neiland, Yevgeny Kafelnikov, and Andrei Medvedev. Born in Moscow, Russia, the 5' 10" Bogomolov was the no. 1 ranked USTA player for the 18s section in 2000 , and had a career-high ranking of world no. 33 on October 31, 2011.

In 1998, Bogomolov won the USTA National Boys' 16 Championships, defeating Andy Roddick in the final.

He was the first player to be beaten by David Nalbandian in the main draw of a Grand Slam tournament, at the 2001 US Open.

In 2005, he was suspended for 1.5 months due to a positive doping test during the Australian Open. The banned substance found was salbutamol, which Bogomolov admitted taking through an inhaler to treat exercise-induced asthma. However, he had not filed the proper paperwork and was not covered by an exemption. The tribunal found that since he had not intentionally taken the drug in an effort to boost his performance, the usual two-year ban did not apply. He lost the prize money and ranking points earned at several competitions.

In July 2008, he won the Shotgun 21 world championship at the Pacific Palisades Tennis Center, defeating John Isner in the semifinal, and Phillip King in the final, twice by the score of 21–20.

Bogomolov beat world no. 83 Bobby Reynolds, 6–2, 4–6, 6–3, in Waco, Texas in September 2008. After having surgery on his left wrist in late 2008, Bogomolov began work at the Gotham Tennis Academy.

In July 2009 at the Hall of Fame Championships, he defeated Arnaud Clément of France, 1–6, 6–3, 6–4.

Bogomolov won his first Challenger title in three years in Champaign-Urbana over Amer Delić, 5–7, 7–6, 6–3. It is his first title of 2010.

In 2011, he defeated Andy Murray in straight sets, 6–1, 7–5, in the second round of the Miami Masters 1000. He was defeated by John Isner in the third round, 2–6, 6–7. At the 2011 Farmers Classic, Bogomolov was defeated by Ernests Gulbis in the semifinals, 2–6, 6–7. He defeated Robby Ginepri in straight sets, 6–4, 6–3, in the first round of the Western & Southern Open. He set up a rematch against Andy Murray, after defeating an out-of-sorts world no. 10 Jo-Wilfried Tsonga, 6–3, 6–4, in the second round. He lost to Murray, 2–6, 5–7.

At the US Open, he lost in the third round to John Isner, 6–7, 4–6, 4–6. He was eliminated in the first round in Kuala Lumpur by Marcos Baghdatis, 6–7, 4–6.

At the end of the 2011 season he was named the ATP's most improved player after rising from no.166 in the ATP rankings at the beginning of 2011 to no. 33 at season's end.

On December 1, 2011, the International Tennis Federation ruled him eligible to compete for Russia in the Davis Cup.

Bogomolov retired at the end of 2014. His final match was a straight sets loss to Tatsuma Ito in the second round of qualifying at the 2014 US Open.

Personal
Bogomolov was married to American tennis player Ashley Harkleroad. The two split up in the fall of 2006 after less than two years, and divorced.  "I think we were too young to be married," Harkleroad said. "And I think he's better off without me."
He is now engaged to his girlfriend Luana, with whom he has a son, Maddox.

ATP career finals

Doubles: 1 (1–1)

Performance timelines

Singles

Doubles

See also
List of sportspeople sanctioned for doping offences

References

External links
 
 
 
 
 
 
 USTA: Alex Bogomolov Jr. Circuit Player of the Week Article(cache)
 Rothenberg, Ben, "Bogomolov Switches Flags in a Boost For Russia", The New York Times Straight Sets blog, January 19, 2012. Bogomolov "said his 2-year-old son helped influence his decision to switch from playing for the United States to Russia".

1983 births
Living people
American male tennis players
American sportspeople in doping cases
Doping cases in tennis
Tennis players from Miami
Tennis players from Moscow
Russian emigrants to the United States
Russian male tennis players
Russian people of American descent 
Tennis players at the 2003 Pan American Games
Tennis players at the 2012 Summer Olympics
Olympic tennis players of Russia
Pan American Games bronze medalists for the United States
Pan American Games medalists in tennis
Medalists at the 2003 Pan American Games